Jason Palmada (born 25 February 1977) is a New Zealand former rugby league footballer.

Playing career
A West Coast representative before moving to Auckland, Palmada was also a Junior Kiwi.

Palmada played for the North Harbour Sea Eagles in the first two season of the Lion Red Cup. He played in both of the Grand Finals which were both won by the Sea Eagles. In 1995 he was selected in the New Zealand Residents side.

In 1996 Palmada moved to England, joining Workington Town in the Super League competition.

Palmada returned to New Zealand in 1998, joining Canterbury.

He now lives in Australia.

References

1969 births
New Zealand rugby league players
New Zealand Māori rugby league players
New Zealand Māori rugby league team players
Auckland rugby league team players
Workington Town players
North Harbour rugby league team players
Canterbury rugby league team players
West Coast rugby league team players
Runanga players
Northcote Tigers players
Junior Kiwis players
Living people
Rugby league second-rows